Han Peng (born October 13, 1996) is a Chinese curler from Changchun, China. He is currently the alternate on the Chinese National Men's Curling Team skipped by Zou Qiang.

Career
Han became the alternate on the Chinese National Men's Curling Team for the 2019–20 season. The team represented China at the 2019 Pacific-Asia Curling Championships, where they won the bronze medal. This qualified them for the 2020 World Qualification Event, which they won, earning them a spot at the 2020 World Men's Curling Championship. They would not, however, get the chance to play in the World Championship as it was cancelled due to the COVID-19 pandemic. As the championship was cancelled, the team represented China the following season at the 2021 World Men's Curling Championship in Calgary, Alberta where they finished in last place with a 2–11 record.

Personal life
Han is a full-time curler.

Teams

References

External links

1996 births
Living people
Chinese male curlers
Sportspeople from Jilin
Sportspeople from Changchun
Sportspeople from Harbin
21st-century Chinese people